The Telemedicine and Advanced Technology Research Center (TATRC) performs medical reconnaissance and special operations to address critical gaps that are underrepresented in DoD medical research programs. TATRC is an office of the headquarters of the US Army Medical Research and Materiel Command (USAMRMC).

Commanders of TATRC and its precursors

History 
The need for a TATRC- like organization was recognized as early as 1990, when the Army and Air Force medical departments wanted to jointly develop, procure, and deploy a filmless medical diagnostic imaging system (MDIS), at a time when such a system did not exist. On 1 November 1991, Lieutenant Colonel Fred Goeringer was assigned as the MDIS project officer, and by 1993, under his leadership, the Navy had also joined this effort and a formal organization, the Medical Advanced Technology Management Office (MATMO) was established. MATMO, as it was referred to, became better known as the DOD “Telemedicine Test Bed” after the Assistant Secretary of Defense for Health Affairs designated the Army as Executive Agent for telemedicine in 1994.

During the mid-1990s a broad array of advanced and developing technologies were used to meet military medicine requirements including biomedical science, a secure global positioning system, wireless networking, data compression, and adaptable tactical and mobile networks. In March 1996, COL Gary Gilbert, Ph.D., US Army Medical Service Corps succeeded COL Goeringer as Director. In 1997, Col Jeffrey Roller, MD, US Air Force Medical Corps was assigned to serve as Clinical Director and subsequently succeeded COL Gilbert who became the MRMC Deputy for IM/IT until his retirement in June 1998. In 1998, MATMO was reorganized and renamed the Telemedicine and Advanced Technology Research Center (TATRC). Colonel Roller continued as Director until his retirement in October 2006, at which time Colonel Karl Friedl Ph.D., US Army Medical Service Corps, assumed the directorship.

Since its inception, TATRC has played a prominent role in developing advanced technologies in areas such as health informatics; medical imaging; mobile computing and remote monitoring; and simulation and training. TATRC also played an important role in championing organizations such as The American Telemedicine Association (ATA) during its early years, and has continued to be an important thought leader in areas such as the use of virtual reality tools, biomaterials and hospital-of-the-future concepts. The use of advanced technologies to support deployed forces has been a common theme as far back as 1993, when LTC Ronald Poropatich, MD, with dual appointments at Walter Reed Army Medical Center and MATMO deployed to Somalia during Operation Restore Hope.

Between 1993 and 1996 tertiary care telemedicine was supported from the Walter Reed Telemedicine Directorate and was deployed for military medical missions in 12 countries.

Currently, TATRC manages more than $250 million annually, primarily through congressional special interest funding, and has expanded from its original office at Fort Detrick, Maryland, to a more global presence with offices in Georgia, California, Hawaii and Europe. Equally important has been TATRC's partnership with numerous universities, commercial enterprises, and other federal agencies, supporting approximately 500 ongoing research projects.

Notes 
This article contains information that originally came from the US Government publications and websites and is in the public domain.

References 

Fort Detrick
Army, Medical Materiel Agency
United States Army medical research facilities